The  Battle of Karksi (also known as  Battle of Karkus) was fought during the Polish–Swedish War (1600–1611) between the Polish–Lithuanian Commonwealth and the Kingdom of Sweden on 29 October 1600.

History 
Polish–Lithuanian Commonwealth forces under the command of Jürgen von Farensbach defeated the Swedish forces commanded by Carl Gyllenhielm.
Before the battle, Pärnu was besieged on 17 September and after heavy bombardment it surrendered on 17 October. Then the Swedish army moved for Fellin (Viljandi), shielded from the south by a force of 1,500. On the night of 29/30 October the shielding force was caught and destroyed near Karkus by Farensbach, voivode of Wenden, with 1,200 horses.

References

Karksi 1600
Karksi (1600)
1600 in Europe
Karksi 1600
16th century in Estonia
Mulgi Parish
Poland–Sweden relations
Karski